Melvin Hulse (1947 – 6 April 2022) was a Belizean politician, born in the then Crown Colony of British Honduras. He was the Minister of Public Utilities and Transport and Communications in Belize. He attended Lyman College and served with the then British Honduras Volunteer Guard.

Hulse was a member of the House of Representatives for Stann Creek West.

Hulse was diagnosed with cancer and died on 6 April 2022.

References

1947 births
2022 deaths 
United Democratic Party (Belize) politicians
Government ministers of Belize
Members of the Belize House of Representatives for Stann Creek West
Deaths from cancer in Belize 
Deaths from colorectal cancer